Scott Edward Morriss  (born 10 October 1973 in Wandsworth, London) is an English bass player and illustrator, best known as a member of The Bluetones. He is the younger brother of frontman Mark Morriss, and played in Mark's backing group, The Mummys.

Currently based in Tokyo, Morriss works as a freelance animator, illustrator and bass guitar player.

References

1973 births
Living people
English songwriters
English rock bass guitarists
Male bass guitarists
English animators
English illustrators
People from Wandsworth
People from Hounslow
The Bluetones members
Britpop musicians
21st-century English bass guitarists
21st-century British male musicians
British male songwriters